Natwar High School also called Government Natwar High School is a Government run, co-educational, high school in Raigarh, India. It is located Near Clock tower, Raigarh. It is one of the oldest high school of Chhattisgarh. It is currently affiliated to CBSE.

History
It was established in 1906 by Raja of Raigarh State, Raja Bhup Deo Singh Bahadur. He named it after his son and heir-apparent, Natwar Singh

See also
Education in India
Literacy in India   
List of institutions of higher education in Chhattisgarh
Education in Chhattisgarh

References

External links

Educational institutions established in 1906
Schools in the princely states of India
Government schools in India
1906 establishments in India
High schools and secondary schools in Chhattisgarh